SSCI may refer to:
 Social Sciences Citation Index
 Southern Society for Clinical Investigation
 United States Senate Select Committee on Intelligence